Tylochromis polylepis is a species of cichlid native to Lake Tanganyika and the Lukuga River, where it is found in swampy habitats. It can be found in the aquarium trade.

References

External links
 Photograph

Tylochromis
Taxa named by George Albert Boulenger
Taxonomy articles created by Polbot
Fish described in 1900